Sergei Zelenin (born 1 September 1975 in Bryansk) is a former Russian football player.

References

1975 births
Sportspeople from Bryansk
Living people
FC Dynamo Bryansk players
Soviet footballers
Russian footballers
FC Kuban Krasnodar players
Russian Premier League players

Association football midfielders